Lavina O'Mealey (born 26 March 1984) is an Australian international rugby league player who plays Glebe Dirty Reds in the NSWRL Women's Premiership.

Playing career
O'Mealey began playing rugby league in 2009 for the Redfern All Blacks and in 2011 represented New South Wales.

In 2017, she was a member of the Jillaroos 2017 Women's Rugby League World Cup winning side, coming off the interchange in the final against New Zealand. In 2018, she played for the NSW City at the National Women's Championships.

In June 2018, O'Mealey was announced as one of the fifteen marquee signings by the Sydney Roosters women's team.

In Round 1 of the 2018 NRL Women's Premiership, O'Mealey made her debut for the Sydney Roosters, starting at five-eighth in their 10–4 loss to the New Zealand Warriors.

In 2021, she joined the Glebe Dirty Reds for their inaugural season in the NSWRL Women's Premiership.

References

External links
Sydney Roosters profile

Living people
Australian female rugby league players
Australia women's national rugby league team players
Indigenous Australian rugby league players
Sydney Roosters (NRLW) players
Rugby league five-eighths
1984 births